The 2023 WNBA season will be the 27th season of the Women's National Basketball Association (WNBA). The Las Vegas Aces are the defending champions.

The regular season was expanded to 40 games per team, becoming the most games scheduled in a single WNBA season. The 2022 season saw the schedule increase to 36 games and was the previous high for the regular season. This season will also be the second straight year that the playoffs will be an all-series format after returning to it in 2022. The first round will use a 2–1 format, with the higher seed hosting the first two games (differing from the 1–1–1 format previously used in 2015). The semifinals and the WNBA Finals will remain a best-of-five series.

Arguably the most significant change to the league this season is the enforcement of the so-called "prioritization clause" in the collective bargaining agreement between the league and its players' union. For this season, players with more than two seasons of prior WNBA service who do not report to their teams by the designated start of training camp or May 1, whichever is later, face mandatory fines. Those who miss the start of the regular season will be suspended for the season. From 2024 on, those who miss the start of training camp will be suspended for the season.

2023 WNBA draft

The Indiana Fever won the first pick in the 2023 WNBA draft in the draft lottery. This was the first time in Indiana's franchise history that they won the first pick. They were followed by the Minnesota Lynx for second, Atlanta Dream for third, and the Washington Mystics for fourth. The Mystics received the fourth pick in the lottery after trading for the Los Angeles Sparks pick during the 2022 season. The Dream had originally held the Sparks pick, but traded it to the Mystics prior to the 2022 WNBA draft, when they acquired the first overall pick.

Lottery picks

Media coverage
In March 2023, the WNBA announced that they and ESPN will show up to 52 possible games throughout the regular season and playoffs. The first broadcast will happen on May 19, 2023, when the Phoenix Mercury visit the Los Angeles Sparks on ESPN.

There will be 10 broadcasts on ABC including the 2023 WNBA All-Star Game, 10 on ESPN, and 5 on ESPN2. The All-Star Game will be aired in primetime for the first time ever, as well.

WNBA Countdown will now be available throughout the regular season with at least 10 editions immediately preceding game broadcasts.

Transactions

Retirement 
 Sue Bird publicly confirmed on June 16, 2022 that she will retire from playing professional basketball after the 2022 WNBA season. Her career ended on September 7, 2022 with the Storm's playoff loss to the Las Vegas Aces.  Over her twenty-year career she won the WNBA Finals four times (2004, 2010, 2018, 2020).  She was a thirteen time WNBA All-Star, and named to the All-WNBA Team eight times, with five being first team selections and three being second team selections.  At the time of her retirement she was the career leader in the WNBA in assists.

 During the 2022 season, Sylvia Fowles announced that she would retire at the end of the season.  Over her fifteen-year career, she won the WNBA Finals twice (2015 & 2017) and was named Finals MVP in both victories.  She was regular season MVP in 2017.  She was an eight time WNBA All-Star, and named to the All-WNBA Team eight times with three being first team selections and five being second team selections.  Her eight All-WBA appearances are tied for fifth all-time at the time of her retirement.  Fowles was the Defensive Player of the Year four times and named to the WNBA All-Defensive Team in eleven of her fifteen seasons.  At the time of her retirement, she was the career leader in the WNBA in rebounds.

 On January 16, 2023, Maya Moore announced that she was officially retiring from basketball.  Moore had not played since the 2018 season and had taken time off to focus on other initiatives.  Over her eight-year career, she won the WNBA Finals four times (2011, 2013, 2015, 2017) and was named the Finals MVP in 2013.  She was regular season MVP in 2014 and Rookie of the Year in 2011.  She was a six time WNBA All-Star, and named to the All-WNBA Team seven times with five being first team selections and two being second team selections.  She was also named All-Star Game MVP three times, in 2015, 2017, and 2018.

 On August 14, 2022, Kia Vaughn announced her retirement.  Over her thirteen-year WNBA career she played for five different WNBA teams and was named the most improved player in 2011.

Free Agency 

The free agency negotiation period began on January 21, 2023, and teams were able to officially sign players starting February 1.

Coaching changes
Off-season

Regular season

All-Star Game

Standings

Schedule

|-
| Monday, April 10
| 7:00 p.m.
| colspan=3| 2023 WNBA draft
| colspan=5| USA: ESPNCanada: TSN
| New York
|-
| Saturday, May 13
| TBD
| Chicago
| vs
| Minnesota
| USA: TBDCanada: TSN, SN
| 
| 
| 
| 
| Scotiabank Arena
|-

! colspan=2 style="background:#094480; color:white" | 2023 WNBA regular season
|- 

|-
| rowspan=5 | Friday, May 19
|-style="background:#FED8B1"
| 7:00 p.m.
| Connecticut
| @ 
| Indiana
| 
| 
| 
| 
| 
| Gainbridge Fieldhouse
|-style="background:#FED8B1"
| 7:00 p.m.
| New York
| @ 
| Washington
| 
| 
| 
| 
| 
| Entertainment and Sports Arena
|-
| 8:00 p.m.
| Chicago
| @ 
| Minnesota
| 
| 
| 
| 
| 
| Target Center
|-
|-style="background:#FED8B1"
| 10:00 p.m.
| Phoenix
| @ 
| Los Angeles
| ESPN, ESPN+
| 
| 
| 
| 
| Crypto.com Arena
|-
| rowspan=3 | Saturday, May 20
|-
| 1:00 p.m.
| Atlanta
| @ 
| Dallas
| ABC
| 
| 
| 
| 
| College Park Center
|-style="background:#FED8B1"
| 3:00 p.m.
| Las Vegas
| @ 
| Seattle
| ABC
| 
| 
| 
| 
| Climate Pledge Arena
|-
| rowspan=4 | Sunday, May 21
|-style="background:#FED8B1"
| 1:00 p.m.
| Washington
| @ 
| Connecticut
| 
| 
| 
| 
| 
| Mohegan Sun Arena
|-style="background:#FED8B1"
| 2:00 p.m.
| Indiana
| @ 
| New York
| 
| 
| 
| 
| 
| Barclays Center
|-
| 4:00 p.m.
| Chicago
| @ 
| Phoenix
| ESPN, ESPN+
| 
| 
| 
| 
| Footprint Center
|-
| rowspan=3 | Tuesday, May 23
|-style="background:#FED8B1"
| 7:00 p.m.
| Connecticut
| @ 
| Washington
| 
| 
| 
| 
| 
| Entertainment and Sports Arena
|-
| 8:00 p.m.
| Atlanta
| @ 
| Minnesota
| 
| 
| 
| 
| 
| Target Center
|-
| rowspan=3 | Thursday, May 25
|-style="background:#FED8B1"
| 10:00 p.m.
| Las Vegas
| @ 
| Los Angeles
| 
| 
| 
| 
| 
| Crypto.com Arena
|-style="background:#FED8B1"
| 10:00 p.m.
| Minnesota
| @ 
| Phoenix
| 
| 
| 
| 
| 
| Footprint Center
|-
| rowspan=3 | Friday, May 26
|-style="background:#FED8B1"
| 8:00 p.m.
| Washington
| @ 
| Chicago
| 
| 
| 
| 
| 
| Wintrust Arena
|-style="background:#FED8B1"
| 10:00 p.m.
| Dallas
| @ 
| Seattle
| 
| 
| 
| 
| 
| Climate Pledge Arena
|-
| rowspan=3 | Saturday, May 27
|-style="background:#FED8B1"
| 1:00 p.m.
| Connecticut
| @ 
| New York
| 
| 
| 
| 
| 
| Barclays Center
|-style="background:#FED8B1"
| 9:00 p.m.
| Los Angeles
| @ 
| Las Vegas
| 
| 
| 
| 
| 
| Michelob Ultra Arena
|-
| rowspan=4 | Sunday, May 28
|-style="background:#FED8B1"
| 3:00 p.m.
| Indiana
| @ 
| Atlanta
| 
| 
| 
| 
| 
| Gateway Center Arena
|-
| 6:00 p.m.
| Dallas
| @ 
| Chicago
| 
| 
| 
| 
| 
| Wintrust Arena
|-style="background:#FED8B1"
| 9:00 p.m.
| Minnesota
| @ 
| Las Vegas
| 
| 
| 
| 
| 
| Michelob Ultra Arena
|-
| rowspan=5 | Tuesday, May 30
|-style="background:#FED8B1"
| 7:00 p.m.
| Chicago
| @ 
| Atlanta
| 
| 
| 
| 
| 
| Gateway Center Arena
|-style="background:#FED8B1"
| 7:00 p.m.
| Indiana
| @ 
| Connecticut
| 
| 
| 
| 
| 
| Mohegan Sun Arena
|-style="background:#FED8B1"
| 8:00 p.m.
| Minnesota
| @ 
| Dallas
| 
| 
| 
| 
| 
| College Park Center
|-
| 9:00 p.m.
| New York
| @ 
| Seattle
| ESPN2
| 
| 
| 
| 
| Climate Pledge Arena

|- 

|-
| Thursday, June 1
| 8:00 p.m.
| Connecticut
| @ 
| Minnesota
| 
| 
| 
| 
| 
| Target Center
|-
| rowspan=5 | Friday, June 2
|-style="background:#FED8B1"
| 6:00 p.m.
| New York
| @ 
| Chicago
| 
| 
| 
| 
| 
| Wintrust Arena
|-
| 7:00 p.m.
| Dallas
| @ 
| Washington
| 
| 
| 
| 
| 
| Entertainment and Sports Arena
|-
| 7:30 p.m.
| Las Vegas
| @ 
| Atlanta
| 
| 
| 
| 
| 
| Gateway Center Arena
|-style="background:#FED8B1"
| 10:00 p.m.
| Los Angeles
| @ 
| Phoenix
| 
| 
| 
| 
| 
| Footprint Center
|-
| rowspan=3 | Saturday, June 3
|-
| 7:00 p.m.
| Minnesota
| @ 
| Washington
| 
| 
| 
| 
| 
| Entertainment and Sports Arena
|-style="background:#FED8B1"
| 10:00 p.m.
| Seattle
| @ 
| Los Angeles
| 
| 
| 
| 
| 
| Crypto.com Arena
|-
| rowspan=4| Sunday, June 4
|-
| 1:00 p.m.
| Dallas
| @ 
| Connecticut
| 
| 
| 
| 
| 
| Mohegan Sun Arena
|-style="background:#FED8B1"
| 2:00 p.m.
| Chicago
| @ 
| New York
| 
| 
| 
| 
| 
| Barclays Center
|-
| 4:00 p.m.
| Las Vegas
| @ 
| Indiana
| 
| 
| 
| 
| 
| Gainbridge Fieldhouse
|-
| rowspan=4| Tuesday, June 6
|-
| 7:00 p.m.
| Las Vegas
| @ 
| Connecticut
| 
| 
| 
| 
| 
| Mohegan Sun Arena
|-style="background:#FED8B1"
| 8:00 p.m.
| Indiana
| @ 
| Chicago
| 
| 
| 
| 
| 
| Wintrust Arena
|-style="background:#FED8B1"
| 10:00 p.m.
| Los Angeles
| @ 
| Seattle
| 
| 
| 
| 
| 
| Climate Pledge Arena
|-
| rowspan=3| Wednesday, June 7
|-
| 7:00 p.m.
| Minnesota
| @ 
| New York
| 
| 
| 
| 
| 
| Barclays Center
|-style="background:#FED8B1"
| 8:00 p.m.
| Phoenix
| @ 
| Dallas
| 
| 
| 
| 
| 
| College Park Center
|-
| Thursday, June 8
| 7:00 p.m.
| Las Vegas
| @ 
| Connecticut
| 
| 
| 
| 
| 
| Mohegan Sun Arena
|-
| rowspan=6| Friday, June 9
|-style="background:#FED8B1"
| 7:30 p.m.
| New York
| @ 
| Atlanta
| 
| 
| 
| 
| 
| Gateway Center Arena
|-
| 8:00 p.m.
| Phoenix
| @ 
| Dallas
| 
| 
| 
| 
| 
| College Park Center
|-
| 8:00 p.m.
| Indiana
| @ 
| Minnesota
| 
| 
| 
| 
| 
| Target Center
|-
| 10:00 p.m.
| Chicago
| @ 
| Los Angeles
| 
| 
| 
| 
| 
| Crypto.com Arena
|-
| 10:00 p.m.
| Washington
| @ 
| Seattle
| 
| 
| 
| 
| 
| Climate Pledge Arena
|-
| rowspan=7| Sunday, June 11
|-
| 1:00 p.m.
| Dallas
| @ 
| New York
| ABC
| 
| 
| 
| 
| Barclays Center
|-
| 3:00 p.m.
| Chicago
| @ 
| Las Vegas
| 
| 
| 
| 
| 
| Michelob Ultra Arena
|-
| 4:00 p.m.
| Washington
| @ 
| Seattle
| ABC
| 
| 
| 
| 
| Climate Pledge Arena
|-style="background:#FED8B1"
| 4:00 p.m.
| Connecticut
| @ 
| Atlanta
| 
| 
| 
| 
| 
| Gateway Center Arena
|-
| 4:00 p.m.
| Phoenix
| @ 
| Indiana
| 
| 
| 
| 
| 
| Gainbridge Fieldhouse
|-style="background:#FED8B1"
| 7:00 p.m.
| Los Angeles
| @ 
| Minnesota
| 
| 
| 
| 
| 
| Target Center
|-
| rowspan=4| Tuesday, June 13
|-style="background:#FED8B1"
| 7:00 p.m.
| Washington
| @ 
| Indiana
| 
| 
| 
| 
| 
| Gainbridge Fieldhouse
|-style="background:#FED8B1"
| 7:00 p.m.
| Atlanta
| @ 
| New York
| 
| 
| 
| 
| 
| Barclays Center
|-style="background:#FED8B1"
| 10:00 p.m.
| Seattle
| @ 
| Phoenix
| 
| 
| 
| 
| 
| Footprint Center
|-
| rowspan=2 | Wednesday, June 14
|-style="background:#FED8B1"
| 1:00 p.m.
| Los Angeles
| @ 
| Dallas
| 
| 
| 
| 
| 
| College Park Center
|-
| rowspan=4 | Thursday, June 15
|-style="background:#FED8B1"
| 7:00 p.m.
| Atlanta
| @ 
| Connecticut
| 
| 
| 
| 
| 
| Mohegan Sun Arena
|-
| 8:00 p.m.
| Indiana
| @ 
| Chicago
| 
| 
| 
| 
| 
| Wintrust Arena
|-style="background:#FED8B1"
| 10:00 p.m.
| Seattle
| @ 
| Las Vegas
| 
| 
| 
| 
| 
| Michelob Ultra Arena
|-
| rowspan=3 | Friday, June 16
|-
| 7:00 p.m.
| Phoenix
| @ 
| Washington
| 
| 
| 
| 
| 
| Entertainment and Sports Arena
|-style="background:#FED8B1"
| 10:00 p.m.
| Minnesota
| @ 
| Los Angeles
| 
| 
| 
| 
| 
| Crypto.com Arena
|-
| rowspan=2 | Saturday, June 17
|-style="background:#FED8B1"
| 2:00 p.m.
| Seattle
| @ 
| Dallas
| 
| 
| 
| 
| 
| College Park Center
|-
| rowspan=6 | Sunday, June 18
|-
| 1:00 p.m.
| Phoenix
| @ 
| New York
| 
| 
| 
| 
| 
| Barclays Center
|-style="background:#FED8B1"
| 3:00 p.m.
| Chicago
| @ 
| Washington
| 
| 
| 
| 
| 
| Entertainment and Sports Arena
|-style="background:#FED8B1"
| 4:00 p.m.
| Atlanta
| @ 
| Indiana
| 
| 
| 
| 
| 
| Gainbridge Fieldhouse
|-
| 7:30 p.m.
| Connecticut
| @ 
| Los Angeles
| 
| 
| 
| 
| 
| Crypto.com Arena
|-
| 9:00 p.m.
| Minnesota
| @ 
| Las Vegas
| 
| 
| 
| 
| 
| Michelob Ultra Arena
|-
| rowspan=4 | Tuesday, June 20
|-
| 8:00 p.m.
| Atlanta
| @ 
| Dallas
| 
| 
| 
| 
| 
| College Park Center
|-
| 10:00 p.m.
| Minnesota
| @ 
| Los Angeles
| 
| 
| 
| 
| 
| Crypto.com Arena
|-
| 10:00 p.m.
| Connecticut
| @ 
| Seattle
| 
| 
| 
| 
| 
| Climate Pledge Arena
|-
| rowspan=2 | Wednesday, June 21
|-style="background:#FED8B1"
| 3:30 p.m.
| Las Vegas
| @ 
| Phoenix
| 
| 
| 
| 
| 
| Footprint Center
|-
| rowspan=4 | Thursday, June 22
|-
| 8:00 p.m.
| Washington
| @ 
| Chicago
| 
| 
| 
| 
| 
| Wintrust Arena
|-
| 8:00 p.m.
| Connecticut
| @ 
| Minnesota
| 
| 
| 
| 
| 
| Target Center
|-
| 10:00 p.m.
| Indiana
| @ 
| Seatlte
| 
| 
| 
| 
| 
| Climate Pledge Arena
|-
| rowspan=3 | Friday, June 23
|-
| 7:30 p.m.
| New York
| @ 
| Atlanta
| 
| 
| 
| 
| 
| Gateway Center Arena
|-style="background:#FED8B1"
| 10:00 p.m.
| Dallas
| @ 
| Los Angeles
| 
| 
| 
| 
| 
| Crypto.com Arena
|-
| rowspan=3 | Saturday, June 24
|-
| 9:00 p.m.
| Indiana
| @ 
| Las Vegas
| 
| 
| 
| 
| 
| Michelob Ultra Arena
|-style="background:#FED8B1"
| 9:00 p.m.
| Phoenix
| @ 
| Seattle
| 
| 
| 
| 
| 
| Climate Pledge Arena
|-
| rowspan=4 | Sunday, June 25
|-style="background:#FED8B1"
| 1:00 p.m.
| Chicago
| @ 
| Connecticut
| 
| 
| 
| 
| 
| Mohegan Sun Arena
|-style="background:#FED8B1"
| 1:00 p.m.
| Washington
| @ 
| New York
| ABC
| 
| 
| 
| 
| Barclays Center
|-
| 3:00 p.m.
| Dallas
| @ 
| Los Angeles
| ABC
| 
| 
| 
| 
| Crypto.com Arena
|-
| Monday, June 26
| 10:00 p.m.
| Indiana
| @ 
| Las Vegas
| 
| 
| 
| 
| 
| Michelob Ultra Arena
|-
| rowspan=4 | Sunday, June 27
|-style="background:#FED8B1"
| 7:00 p.m.
| New York
| @ 
| Connecticut
| 
| 
| 
| 
| 
| Mohegan Sun Arena
|-style="background:#FED8B1"
| 8:00 p.m.
| Seattle
| @ 
| Minnesota
| 
| 
| 
| 
| 
| Target Center
|-style="background:#FED8B1"
| 10:00 p.m.
| Dallas
| @ 
| Phoenix
| 
| 
| 
| 
| 
| Footprint Center
|-
| rowspan=3 | Wednesday, June 28
|-
| 12:00 p.m.
| Los Angeles Sparks
| @ 
| Chicago
| 
| 
| 
| 
| 
| Wintrust Arena
|-style="background:#FED8B1"
| 7:00 p.m.
| Atlanta
| @ 
| Washington
| 
| 
| 
| 
| 
| Entertainment and Sports Arena
|-
| rowspan=4 | Thursday, June 29
|-
| 10:00 p.m.
| New York
| @ 
| Las Vegas
| 
| 
| 
| 
| 
| Michelob Ultra Arena
|-
| 10:00 p.m.
| Indiana
| @ 
| Phoenix
| 
| 
| 
| 
| 
| Footprint Center
|-style="background:#FED8B1"
| 10:00 p.m.
| Minnesota
| @ 
| Seattle
| 
| 
| 
| 
| 
| Climate Pledge Arena
|-
| rowspan=3 | Friday, June 30
|-style="background:#FED8B1"
| 7:30 p.m.
| Washington
| @ 
| Atlanta
| 
| 
| 
| 
| 
| Gateway Center Arena
|-
| 8:00 p.m.
| Los Angeles
| @ 
| Chicago
| 
| 
| 
| 
| 
| Wintrust Arena

|-
| rowspan=3 | Saturday, July 1
|-
| 3:00 p.m.
| Connecticut
| @ 
| Las Vegas
| ABC
| 
| 
| 
| 
| Michelob Ultra Arena
|-
| 10:00 p.m.
| Minnesota
| @ 
| Phoenix
| 
| 
| 
| 
| 
| Footprint Center
|-
| rowspan=5| Sunday, July 2
|-
| 3:00 p.m.
| Los Angeles
| @ 
| Atlanta
| 
| 
| 
| 
| 
| Gateway Center Arena
|-
| 3:00 p.m.
| Washington
| @ 
| Dallas
| ABC
| 
| 
| 
| 
| College Park Center
|-style="background:#FED8B1"
| 4:00 p.m.
| Chicago
| @ 
| Indiana
| 
| 
| 
| 
| 
| Gainbridge Fieldhouse
|-
| 6:00 p.m.
| New York
| @ 
| Seattle
| 
| 
| 
| 
| 
| Climate Pledge Arena
|-
| rowspan=5| Wednesday, July 5
|-
| 7:00 p.m.
| Phoenix
| @ 
| New York
| 
| 
| 
| 
| 
| Barclays Center
|-
| 8:00 p.m.
| Indiana
| @ 
| Minnesota
| 
| 
| 
| 
| 
| Target Center
|-style="background:#FED8B1"
| 10:00 p.m.
| Dallas
| @ 
| Las Vegas
| 
| 
| 
| 
| 
| Michelob Ultra Arena
|-
| 10:00 p.m.
| Atlanta
| @ 
| Los Angeles
| 
| 
| 
| 
| 
| Crypto.com Arena
|-
| Thursday, July 6
| 7:00 p.m.
| Seattle
| @ 
| Connecticut
| 
| 
| 
| 
| 
| Mohegan Sun Arena
|-
| rowspan=5| Friday, July 7
|-
| 7:00 p.m.
| Indiana
| @ 
| Washington
| 
| 
| 
| 
| 
| Entertainment and Sports Arena
|-
| 8:00 p.m.
| Atlanta
| @ 
| Chicago
| 
| 
| 
| 
| 
| Wintrust Arena
|-
| 8:00 p.m.
| Las Vegas
| @ 
| Dallas
| 
| 
| 
| 
| 
| College Park Center
|-
| 8:00 p.m.
| Phoenix
| @ 
| Minnesota
| 
| 
| 
| 
| 
| Target Center
|-
| Saturday, July 8
| 1:30 p.m.
| Seattle
| @ 
| New York
| ESPN
| 
| 
| 
| 
| Barclays Center
|-
| rowspan=6| Sunday, July 9
|-
| 3:00 p.m.
| Washington
| @ 
| Connecticut
| ESPN
| 
| 
| 
| 
| Mohegan Sun Arena
|-
| 4:00 p.m.
| Dallas
| @ 
| Indiana
| 
| 
| 
| 
| 
| Gainbridge Fieldhouse
|-
| 6:00 p.m.
| Los Angeles
| @ 
| Phoenix
| 
| 
| 
| 
| 
| Footprint Center
|-style="background:#FED8B1"
| 7:00 p.m.
| Las Vegas
| @ 
| Minnesota
| 
| 
| 
| 
| 
| Target Center
|-
| 8:00 p.m.
| Atlanta
| @ 
| Chicago
| 
| 
| 
| 
| 
| Wintrust Arena
|-
| rowspan=3| Tuesday, July 11
|-
| 7:00 p.m.
| Seattle
| @ 
| Washington
| 
| 
| 
| 
| 
| Entertainment and Sports Arena
|-style="background:#FED8B1"
| 10:00 p.m.
| Phoenix
| @ 
| Las Vegas
| 
| 
| 
| 
| 
| Michelob Ultra Arena
|-
| rowspan=6| Wednesday, July 12
|-style="background:#FED8B1"
| 12:00 p.m.
| New York
| @ 
| Indiana
| 
| 
| 
| 
| 
| Gainbridge Fieldhouse
|-style="background:#FED8B1"
| 12:00 p.m.
| Connecticut
| @ 
| Chicago
| 
| 
| 
| 
| 
| Wintrust Arena
|-style="background:#FED8B1"
| 1:00 p.m.
| Dallas
| @ 
| Minnesota
| 
| 
| 
| 
| 
| Target Center
|-
| 7:00 p.m.
| Seattle
| @ 
| Atlanta
| 
| 
| 
| 
| 
| Gateway Center Arena
|-
| 10:00 p.m.
| Las Vegas
| @ 
| Los Angeles
| 
| 
| 
| 
| 
| Crypto.com Arena
|- style="background:#FAFAD2"
| Saturday, July 15
| TBA
| colspan=3 | WNBA All-Star Game
| ABC
| 
|
|
|
| Michelob Ultra Arena
|-
| rowspan=3| Tuesday, July 18
|-
| 7:00 p.m.
| Minnesota
| @ 
| Atlanta
| 
| 
| 
| 
| 
| Gateway Center Arena
|-
| 10:00 p.m.
| Connecticut
| @ 
| Phoenix
| 
| 
| 
| 
| 
| Footprint Center
|-
| rowspan=3| Wednesday, July 19
|-
| 11:30 a.m.
| Indiana
| @ 
| Washington
| 
| 
| 
| 
| 
| Capital One Arena
|-
| 1:00 p.m.
| Dallas
| @ 
| New York
| 
| 
| 
| 
| 
| Barclays Center
|-
| rowspan=5| Thursday, July 20
|-
| 11:30 p.m.
| Atlanta
| @ 
| Connecticut
| 
| 
| 
| 
| 
| Mohegan Sun Arena
|-
| 8:00 p.m.
| Los Angeles
| @ 
| Minnesota
| 
| 
| 
| 
| 
| Target Center
|-
| 10:00 p.m.
| Chicago
| @ 
| Phoenix
| 
| 
| 
| 
| 
| Footprint Center
|-
| 10:00 p.m.
| Las Vegas
| @ 
| Seattle
| 
| 
| 
| 
| 
| Climate Pledge Arena
|-
| Friday, July 21
| 7:00 p.m.
| New York
| @ 
| Washington
| 
| 
| 
| 
| 
| Entertainment and Sports Arena
|-
| rowspan=5| Saturday, July 22
|-
| 1:00 p.m.
| Connecticut
| @ 
| Atlanta
| ESPN
| 
| 
| 
| 
| Gateway Center Arena
|-
| 3:00 p.m.
| Las Vegas
| @ 
| Minnesota
| ESPN
| 
| 
| 
| 
| Target Center
|-
| 3:00 p.m.
| Chicago
| @ 
| Seattle
| 
| 
| 
| 
| 
| Climate Pledge Arena
|-
| 8:00 p.m.
| Los Angeles
| @ 
| Dallas
| 
| 
| 
| 
| 
| College Park Center
|-
| rowspan=3| Sunday, July 23
|-
| 1:00 p.m.
| Indiana
| @ 
| New York
| 
| 
| 
| 
| 
| Barclays Center
|-
| 2:00 p.m.
| Phoenix
| @ 
| Washington
| 
| 
| 
| 
| 
| Entertainment and Sports Arena
|-
| rowspan=6| Tuesday, July 25
|-
| 7:00 p.m.
| Phoenix
| @ 
| Atlanta
| ESPN
| 
| 
| 
| 
| Gateway Center Arena
|-
| 7:00 p.m.
| Seattle
| @ 
| New York
| 
| 
| 
| 
| 
| Barclays Center
|-
| 7:00 p.m.
| Las Vegas
| @ 
| Chicago
| 
| 
| 
| 
| 
| Wintrust Arena
|-
| 8:00 p.m.
| Connecticut
| @ 
| Dallas
| 
| 
| 
| 
| 
| College Park Center
|-
| 10:00 p.m.
| Indiana
| @ 
| Los Angeles
| 
| 
| 
| 
| 
| Crypto.com Arena
|-
| Wednesday, July 26
| 8:00 p.m.
| Washington
| @ 
| Minnesota
| 
| 
| 
| 
| 
| Target Center
|-
| rowspan=3| Thursday, July 27
|-
| 3:30 p.m.
| Indiana
| @ 
| Los Angeles
| 
| 
| 
| 
| 
| Crypto.com Arena
|-
| 7:00 p.m.
| Atlanta
| @ 
| New York
| 
| 
| 
| 
| 
| Barclays Center
|-
| rowspan=3| Friday, July 28
|-
| 8:00 p.m.
| Seattle
| @ 
| Chicago
| 
| 
| 
| 
| 
| Wintrust Arena
|-
| 8:00 p.m.
| Washington
| @ 
| Dallas
| 
| 
| 
| 
| 
| College Park Center
|-
| rowspan=7| Sunday, July 30
|-
| 1:00 p.m.
| Minnesota
| @ 
| Connecticut
| 
| 
| 
| 
| 
| Mohegan Sun Arena
|-
| 3:00 p.m.
| Washington
| @ 
| Atlanta
| 
| 
| 
| 
| 
| Gateway Center Arena
|-
| 4:00 p.m.
| Seattle
| @ 
| Indiana
| 
| 
| 
| 
| 
| Gainbridge Fieldhouse
|-
| 4:00 p.m.
| Phoenix
| @ 
| Chicago
| 
| 
| 
| 
| 
| Wintrust Arena
|-
| 4:00 p.m.
| New York
| @ 
| Los Angeles
| ESPN
| 
| 
| 
| 
| Crypto.com Arena
|-
| 6:00 p.m.
| Dallas
| @ 
| Las Vegas
| 
| 
| 
| 
| 
| Michelob Ultra Arena

|- 

|-
| rowspan=5| Tuesday, August 1
|-
| 7:00 p.m.
| Minnesota
| @ 
| Connecticut
| ESPN
| 
| 
| 
| 
| Mohegan Sun Arena
|-
| 7:00 p.m.
| Phoenix
| @ 
| Indiana
| 
| 
| 
| 
| 
| Gainbridge Fieldhouse
|-
| 10:00 p.m.
| Atlanta
| @ 
| Las Vegas
| 
| 
| 
| 
| 
| Michelob Ultra Arena
|-
| 10:00 p.m.
| New York
| @ 
| Los Angeles
| 
| 
| 
| 
| 
| Crypto.com Arena
|-
| Wednesday, August 2
| 10:00 p.m.
| Dallas
| @ 
| Seattle
| 
| 
| 
| 
| 
| Climate Pledge Arena
|-
| Thursday, August 3
| 10:00 p.m.
| Atlanta
| @ 
| Phoenix
| 
| 
| 
| 
| 
| Footprint Center
|-
| rowspan=5| Friday, August 4
|-
| 7:00 p.m.
| Connecticut
| @ 
| Indiana
| 
| 
| 
| 
| 
| Gainbridge Fieldhouse
|-
| 7:00 p.m.
| Los Angeles
| @ 
| Washington
| 
| 
| 
| 
| 
| Entertainment and Sports Arena
|-
| 8:00 p.m.
| Chicago
| @ 
| Dallas
| 
| 
| 
| 
| 
| College Park Center
|-
| 8:00 p.m.
| New York
| @ 
| Minnesota
| 
| 
| 
| 
| 
| Target Center
|-
| Saturday, August 5
| 10:00 p.m.
| Seattle
| @ 
| Phoenix
| 
| 
| 
| 
| 
| Footprint Center
|-
| rowspan=5| Sunday, August 6
|-
| 3:00 p.m.
| Indiana
| @ 
| Atlanta
| 
| 
| 
| 
| 
| Gateway Center Arena
|-
| 3:00 p.m.
| Las Vegas
| @ 
| New York
| ABC
| 
| 
| 
| 
| Barclays Center
|-
| 3:00 p.m.
| Los Angeles
| @ 
| Washington
| 
| 
| 
| 
| 
| Entertainment and Sports Arena
|-
| 4:00 p.m.
| Chicago
| @ 
| Dallas
| 
| 
| 
| 
| 
| College Park Center
|-
| rowspan=6| Tuesday, August 8
|-
| 3:00 p.m.
| Connecticut
| @ 
| Seattle
| 
| 
| 
| 
| 
| Climate Pledge Arena
|-
| 7:00 p.m.
| Los Angeles
| @ 
| Indiana
| 
| 
| 
| 
| 
| Gainbridge Fieldhouse
|-
| 8:00 p.m.
| Minnesota
| @ 
| Chicago
| 
| 
| 
| 
| 
| Wintrust Arena
|-
| 8:00 p.m.
| Las Vegas
| @ 
| Dallas
| 
| 
| 
| 
| 
| College Park Center
|-
| 10:00 p.m.
| Washington
| @ 
| Phoenix
| 
| 
| 
| 
| 
| Footprint Center
|-
| rowspan=4| Thursday, August 10
|-
| 7:00 p.m.
| Minnesota
| @ 
| Indiana
| 
| 
| 
| 
| 
| Gainbridge Fieldhouse
|-
| 10:00 p.m.
| Connecticut
| @ 
| Mercury
| 
| 
| 
| 
| 
| Footprint Center
|-
| 10:00 p.m.
| Atlanta
| @ 
| Seattle
| 
| 
| 
| 
| 
| Climate Pledge Arena
|-
| rowspan=3| Friday, August 11
|-
| 7:30 p.m.
| Chicago
| @ 
| New York
| 
| 
| 
| 
| 
| Barclays Center
|-
| 10:00 p.m.
| Washington
| @ 
| Las Vegas
| 
| 
| 
| 
| 
| Michelob Ultra Arena
|-
| rowspan=3| Saturday, August 12
|-
| 7:30 p.m.
| Atlanta
| @ 
| Los Angeles
| 
| 
| 
| 
| 
| Crypto.com Arena
|-
| 8:00 p.m.
| Connecticut
| @ 
| Dallas
| 
| 
| 
| 
| 
| College Park Center
|-
| rowspan=5| Sunday, August 13
|-
| 3:00 p.m.
| Chicago
| @ 
| Washington
| 
| 
| 
| 
| 
| Entertainment and Sports Arena
|-
| 3:00 p.m.
| New York
| @ 
| Indiana
| ESPN
| 
| 
| 
| 
| Gainbridge Fieldhouse
|-
| 6:00 p.m.
| Phoenix
| @ 
| Seattle
| 
| 
| 
| 
| 
| Climate Pledge Arena
|-
| 9:00 p.m.
| Atlanta
| @ 
| Las Vegas
| 
| 
| 
| 
| 
| Michelob Ultra Arena
|- style="background:#FAFAD2"
| Tuesday, August 15
| TBA
| colspan=3 | 2023 WNBA Commissioner's Cup
| 
| 
|
|
|
|
|-
| Thursday, August 17
| 10:00 p.m.
| New York
| @ 
| Las Vegas
| 
| 
| 
| 
| 
| Michelob Ultra Arena
|-
| rowspan=6| Friday, August 18
|-
| 7:00 p.m.
| Dallas
| @ 
| Connecticut
| 
| 
| 
| 
| 
| Mohegan Sun Arena
|-
| 7:00 p.m.
| Washington
| @ 
| Indiana
| 
| 
| 
| 
| 
| Gainbridge Fieldhouse
|-
| 7:30 p.m.
| Chicago
| @ 
| Atlanta
| 
| 
| 
| 
| 
| Gateway Center Arena
|-
| 10:00 p.m.
| New York
| @ 
| Phoenix
| 
| 
| 
| 
| 
| Footprint Center
|-
| 10:00 p.m.
| Minnesota
| @ 
| Seattle
| 
| 
| 
| 
| 
| Climate Pledge Arena
|-
| Saturday, August 19
| 3:00 p.m.
| Los Angeles
| @ 
| Las Vegas
| ESPN2
| 
| 
| 
| 
| Michelob Ultra Arena
|-
| rowspan=5| Sunday, August 20
|-
| 3:00 p.m.
| Dallas
| @ 
| Washington
| 
| 
| 
| 
| 
| Entertainment and Sports Arena
|-
| 6:00 p.m.
| Connecticut
| @ 
| Chicago
| 
| 
| 
| 
| 
| Wintrust Arena
|-
| 6:00 p.m.
| Indiana
| @ 
| Phoenix
| 
| 
| 
| 
| 
| Footprint Center
|-
| 7:00 p.m.
| Seattle
| @ 
| Minnesota
| 
| 
| 
| 
| 
| Target Center
|-
| rowspan=6| Tuesday, August 22
|-
| 7:00 p.m.
| Las Vegas
| @ 
| Atlanta
| 
| 
| 
| 
| 
| Gateway Center Arena
|-
| 7:00 p.m.
| Connecticut
| @ 
| Washington
| 
| 
| 
| 
| 
| Entertainment and Sports Arena
|-
| 8:00 p.m.
| Seattle
| @ 
| Chicago
| 
| 
| 
| 
| 
| Wintrust Arena
|-
| 8:00 p.m.
| Dallas
| @ 
| Minnesota
| 
| 
| 
| 
| 
| Target Center
|-
| 10:00 p.m.
| Phoenix
| @ 
| Los Angeles
| 
| 
| 
| 
| 
| Crypto.com Arena
|-
| rowspan=5| Thursday, August 24
|-
| 7:00 p.m.
| New York
| @ 
| Connecticut
| 
| 
| 
| 
| 
| Mohegan Sun Arena
|-
| 7:00 p.m.
| Seattle
| @ 
| Indiana
| 
| 
| 
| 
| 
| Gainbridge Fieldhouse
|-
| 8:00 p.m.
| Las Vegas
| @ 
| Chicago
| 
| 
| 
| 
| 
| Wintrust Arena
|-
| 8:00 p.m.
| Minnesota
| @ 
| Dallas
| 
| 
| 
| 
| 
| College Park Center
|-
| Friday, August 25
| 7:30 p.m.
| Los Angeles
| @ 
| Atlanta
| 
| 
| 
| 
| 
| Gateway Center Arena
|-
| rowspan=2| Saturday, August 26
| 7:00 p.m.
| Las Vegas
| @ 
| Washington
| 
| 
| 
| 
| 
| Entertainment and Sports Arena
|-
| 8:00 p.m.
| New York
| @ 
| Minnesota
| 
| 
| 
| 
| 
| Target Center
|-
| rowspan=5| Sunday, August 27
|-
| 1:00 p.m.
| Los Angeles
| @ 
| Connecticut
| 
| 
| 
| 
| 
| Mohegan Sun Arena
|-
| 4:00 p.m.
| Atlanta
| @ 
| Indiana
| 
| 
| 
| 
| 
| Gainbridge Fieldhouse
|-
| 6:00 p.m.
| Dallas
| @ 
| Phoenix
| 
| 
| 
| 
| 
| Footprint Center
|-
| 6:00 p.m.
| Chicago
| @ 
| Seattle
| 
| 
| 
| 
| 
| Climate Pledge Arena
|-
| Monday, August 28
| 7:00 p.m.
| Las Vegas
| @ 
| New York
| ESPN2
| 
| 
| 
| 
| Barclays Center
|-
| rowspan=4| Tuesday, August 29
|-
| 7:00 p.m.
| Phoenix
| @ 
| Atlanta
| 
| 
| 
| 
| 
| Gateway Center Arena
|-
| 7:00 p.m.
| Minnesota
| @ 
| Washington
| 
| 
| 
| 
| 
| Entertainment and Sports Arena
|-
| 10:00 p.m.
| Chicago
| @ 
| Los Angeles
| 
| 
| 
| 
| 
| Crypto.com Arena
|-
| rowspan=4| Thursday, August 31
|-
| 7:00 p.m.
| Phoenix
| @ 
| Connecticut
| 
| 
| 
| 
| 
| Mohegan Sun Arena
|-
| 10:00 p.m.
| Washington
| @ 
| Las Vegas
| 
| 
| 
| 
| 
| Michelob Ultra Arena
|-
| 10:00 p.m.
| Seattle
| @ 
| Los Angeles
| 
| 
| 
| 
| 
| Crypto.com Arena
|-

|-
| rowspan=4| Friday, September 1
|-
| 7:00 p.m.
| Dallas
| @ 
| Indiana
| 
| 
| 
| 
| 
| Gainbridge Fieldhouse
|-
| 7:30 p.m.
| Connecticut
| @ 
| New York
| 
| 
| 
| 
| 
| Barclays Center
|-
| 8:00 p.m.
| Atlanta
| @ 
| Minnesota
| 
| 
| 
| 
| 
| Target Center
|-
| Saturday, September 2
| 9:00 p.m.
| Seattle
| @ 
| Las Vegas
| 
| 
| 
| 
| 
| Michelob Ultra Arena
|-
| rowspan=5| Sunday, September 3
|-
| 3:00 p.m.
| New York
| @ 
| Chicago
| ESPN2
| 
| 
| 
| 
| Wintrust Arena
|-
| 4:00 p.m.
| Indiana
| @ 
| Dallas
| 
| 
| 
| 
| 
| College Park Center
|-
| 7:00 p.m.
| Phoenix
| @ 
| Minnesota
| 
| 
| 
| 
| 
| Target Center
|-
| 7:30 p.m.
| Washington
| @ 
| Los Angeles
| 
| 
| 
| 
| 
| Crypto.com Arena
|-
| rowspan=5| Tuesday, September 5
|-
| 7:00 p.m.
| Los Angeles
| @ 
| Connecticut
| 
| 
| 
| 
| 
| Mohegan Sun Arena
|-
| 7:00 p.m.
| Chicago
| @ 
| Indiana
| 
| 
| 
| 
| 
| Gainbridge Fieldhouse
|-
| 8:00 p.m.
| New York
| @ 
| Dallas
| 
| 
| 
| 
| 
| College Park Center
|-
| 10:00 p.m.
| Washington
| @ 
| Phoenix
| 
| 
| 
| 
| 
| Footprint Center
|-
| Wednesday, September 6
| 7:00 p.m.
| Seattle
| @ 
| Atlanta
| 
| 
| 
| 
| 
| Gateway Center Arena
|-
| Thursday, September 7
| 7:00 p.m.
| Los Angeles
| @ 
| New York
| 
| 
| 
| 
| 
| Barclays Center
|-
| rowspan=6| Sunday, September 8
|-
| 7:00 p.m.
| Indiana
| @ 
| Connecticut
| 
| 
| 
| 
| 
| Mohegan Sun Arena
|-
| 7:00 p.m.
| Atlanta
| @ 
| Washington
| 
| 
| 
| 
| 
| Entertainment and Sports Arena
|-
| 8:00 p.m.
| Minnesota
| @ 
| Chicago
| 
| 
| 
| 
| 
| Wintrust Arena
|-
| 8:00 p.m.
| Seattle
| @ 
| Dallas
| 
| 
| 
| 
| 
| College Park Center
|-
| 10:00 p.m.
| Las Vegas
| @ 
| Phoenix
| 
| 
| 
| 
| 
| Footprint Center
|-
| rowspan=7| Sunday, September 10
|-
| 1:00 p.m.
| Dallas
| @ 
| Atlanta
| 
| 
| 
| 
| 
| Gateway Center Arena
|-
| 1:00 p.m.
| Chicago
| @ 
| Connecticut
| 
| 
| 
| 
| 
| Mohegan Sun Arena
|-
| 1:00 p.m.
| Minnesota
| @ 
| Indiana
| 
| 
| 
| 
| 
| Gainbridge Fieldhouse
|-
| 1:00 p.m.
| Washington
| @ 
| New York
| 
| 
| 
| 
| 
| Barclays Center
|-
| 3:00 p.m.
| Phoenix
| @ 
| Las Vegas
| ESPN2
| 
| 
| 
| 
| T-Mobile Arena
|-
| 3:00 p.m.
| Los Angeles
| @ 
| Seattle
| 
| 
| 
| 
| 
| Climate Pledge Arena
|-

Note: Games highlighted in  ██ represent Commissioner's Cup games.All times Eastern

Statistical leaders

The following shows the leaders in each statistical category during the 2023 regular season.

Playoffs and Finals

Season award winners

Player of the Week Award

Player of the Month Award

Rookie of the Month Award

Coach of the Month Award

Postseason awards

Coaches

Eastern Conference

Western Conference 

Notes:
 Year with team does not include 2023 season.
 Records are from time at current team and are through the end of the 2022 regular season.
 Playoff appearances are from time at current team only.
 WNBA Finals and Championships do not include time with other teams.
 Coaches shown are the coaches who began the 2023 season as head coach of each team.

Notes

References

 
2023 in American women's basketball
2022–23 in American basketball by league
2023–24 in American basketball by league
Women's National Basketball Association seasons